Chrysanthemum zawadskii is a species of perennial herb in the family Asteraceae. Individuals can grow to 15 cm tall.

Sources

References 

zawadskii
Flora of Malta